Semín is a municipality and village in Pardubice District in the Pardubice Region of the Czech Republic. It has about 600 inhabitants.

Notable people
Vikentiy Khvoyka (1850–1914), Ukrainian-Russian archaeologist
Josef Gočár (1880–1945), architect

References

External links

Villages in Pardubice District